A Very Maverick Christmas is the eighth live album by American contemporary worship music collective Maverick City Music, which was released via Tribl Records on November 30, 2021. The album contains guest appearances by Naomi Raine, Todd Galberth, Kim Walker-Smith, Chandler Moore, Melvin Crispell III, Isaac Carree, Lizzie Morgan, Brandon Lake, Phil Wickham, Ryan Ofei, Tianna Horsey, and Natalie Grant. The album was produced by Tony Brown, Jonathan Jay, and Brandon Lake.

The album was promoted with the release of "Mary Did You Know?" as a single. "Mary Did You Know?" peaked at number 23 on the Hot Christian Songs chart and number 11 on the Hot Gospel Songs chart.

A Very Maverick Christmas became a commercially successful album since its release, peaking at number nine on Billboard's Top Christian Albums Chart and at number three Top Gospel Albums Chart in the United States, as well as number five on the Official Charts' Official Christian & Gospel Albums Chart in the United Kingdom. A Very Maverick Christmas received a GMA Dove Award nomination for Christmas / Special Event Album of the Year at the 2022 GMA Dove Awards.

Background
On November 30, 2021, Maverick City Music released A Very Maverick Christmas via Tribl Records, being their second Christmas-themed release following Maverick City Christmas (2020). The album was recorded live at Paradise Baptist Church in Atlanta, Georgia, said to have been started by a slave.

Singles
"Mary Did You Know?" impacted Christian radio in the United States on November 25, 2022, becoming the first single from the album. Maverick City Music released the radio version of "Mary Did You Know?" On December 2, 2022. "Mary Did You Know?" peaked at number 23 on the US Hot Christian Songs chart, and number 11 on the Hot Gospel Songs chart.

Reception

Critical response

In a favourable review for The Christian Beat, Jessie Clarks opined "The full project brings a nice blend of worship and original tracks mixed with remakes and arrangements of traditional holiday hymns."

Accolades

Commercial performance
In the United States, A Very Maverick Christmas debuted at number eleven on the Top Christian Albums Chart and number three on Top Gospel Albums Chart.

In the United Kingdom, A Very Maverick Christmas debuted on the OCC's Official Christian & Gospel Albums Chart at number five.

Track listing

Charts

Weekly charts

Year-end charts

Release history

References

External links
 

2021 Christmas albums
2021 live albums
Maverick City Music albums